SHARE Inc. is a volunteer-run user group for IBM mainframe computers that was founded in 1955 by Los Angeles-area users of the IBM 704 computer system.  It evolved into a forum for exchanging technical information about programming languages, operating systems, database systems, and user experiences for enterprise users of small, medium, and large-scale IBM computers such as IBM S/360, IBM S/370, zSeries, pSeries, and xSeries. Despite the capitalization of all letters in the name, the official website says "SHARE is not an acronym; it's what we do."

Overview
A major resource of SHARE from the beginning was the SHARE library.  Originally, IBM distributed what software it provided in source form
and systems programmers commonly made small local additions or modifications and exchanged them with other users. The SHARE library and the process of distributed development it fostered was one of the major origins of open source software.

In 1959 SHARE released the SHARE Operating System (SOS), originally for the IBM 709 computer, later ported to the IBM 7090.  SOS was one of the first instances of "commons-based peer production" now widely used in the development of free and open-source software such as Linux and the GNU project. In 1963 SHARE participated with IBM in the development of the PL/I programming language as part of the "3x3" committee.

In 1969, members of SHARE in Europe formed a European Chapter of the organisation, which was formalised in 1966 as the "Share European Association (SEAS)", later SHARE Europe (SEAS).The last meeting of 1994 was jointly held with G.U.I.D.E. At this meeting it was decided to dissolve both SHARE Europe and G.U.I.D.E. and establish the new European IBM users group GSE (Guide Share Europe).

The organization produces a newsletter and conducts two major educational meetings per year.

In September 1999, GUIDE International, the other major IBM mainframe users group, ceased operation.  Although SHARE did not formally take over GUIDE in the United States, many of the activities and projects that were undertaken under the aegis of GUIDE moved to SHARE, and GUIDE suggested to its members that they join SHARE.  In August 2000, SHARE took over the guide.org domain name.

In 2005 SHARE's membership of 20,000 represented some 2,300 enterprise IBM customers.

See also
History of free software
History of SHARE Europe .
IBM Type-III Library
DECUS
Seven tiers of disaster recovery
COMMON

References

Further reading

External links
 
 SHARE Library
 Index of SHARE, Inc. Records, 1955-1994 at Charles Babbage Institute, University of Minnesota.
 Index of GUIDE International Records, 1970-1992 at Charles Babbage Institute, University of Minnesota.

IBM user groups
User groups
Free software culture and documents
Organizations based in Chicago
Organizations established in 1955
1955 establishments in California